Kare or Kari is a poorly documented Congolese Bantu language of uncertain affiliation (though listed as unclassified Zone D.30 by Guthrie). There are scattered speakers in the Central African Republic.

References

Bantu languages
Languages of the Democratic Republic of the Congo